Jordy Solly Soladio Kandolo (born 12 February 1998) is a Belgian footballer who plays as a striker for SLNA.

Career

Soladio started his career with Belgian top flight side Mechelen. nIn 2018, he signed for Dessel Sport in the Belgian third tier. In 2020, Soladio signed for Luxembourgian club Victoria Rosport.

In 2022, he signed for Liepāja in Latvia. Before the 2023 season, he signed for Vietnamese team SLNA. On 3 February 2023, Soladio debuted for SLNA during a 1–1 draw with Đà Nẵng.

References

External links
 

Belgian expatriate sportspeople in Luxembourg
Belgian expatriate sportspeople in Latvia
Belgian expatriate footballers
Belgian people of Democratic Republic of the Congo descent
Expatriate footballers in Vietnam
Expatriate footballers in Latvia
Expatriate footballers in Luxembourg
V.League 1 players
Latvian Higher League players
Belgian Pro League players
K.V. Mechelen players
K.F.C. Dessel Sport players
Union Titus Pétange players
FC Victoria Rosport players
FK Liepāja players
Song Lam Nghe An FC players
1998 births
Living people